"Ghetto Child" is a 1973 song recorded by American R&B music group the Spinners (known as "Detroit Spinners" in the UK) for the Atlantic label. It was written by Thom Bell and Linda Creed. It was produced by Bell, and recorded at Philly's Sigma Sound Studios with the house band MFSB providing the backing instrumentation. It is notable for being one of few songs that all three main leads, Bobby Smith, Philippé Wynne and Henry Fambrough sing lead (Wynne and Fambrough on the verses and Smith on the song's bridge). Although some think the song focuses on racial injustice broadly and the injustice of the 1967 Detroit Riot more specifically, the lyrics suggest that the song may be about intra-racial discrimination--the song is written from the perspective of a black child who is derided not (primarily) due to his skin-color but due to his class status.

The group's fifth hit at Atlantic, the song peaked at number four on the R&B chart and number twenty-nine on the Billboard Pop Singles chart.

Personnel
Lead vocals by Philippé Wynne, Henry Fambrough and Bobby Smith 
Background vocals by Bobby Smith, Philippé Wynne, Pervis Jackson, Henry Fambrough and Billy Henderson
Additional background vocals by Linda Creed and The Sweethearts of Sigma (Barbara Ingram, Carla Benson, and Evette Benton)
Instrumentation by MFSB

Chart history

References

1973 singles
The Spinners (American group) songs
Atlantic Records singles
1973 songs
Songs written by Linda Creed
Songs written by Thom Bell